The Theodore Payne Foundation for Wild Flowers and Native Plants — or TPF, is a private, non-profit organization founded in 1960 to promote the understanding and preservation of California native plants. It continues the work of Theodore Payne, an English horticulturist, gardener, landscape designer, and botanist.

The Foundation is located in Sun Valley, in the northeastern San Fernando Valley and western Verdugo Mountains foothills.

Programs
TPF operates a native plant nursery and education center focused on California natives.
Programs include the propagation of a wide range of species and cultivars of the California flora for use in the home landscape; collection and process of seeds from the wild for use in propagation, and courses in the horticulture, botany, and ecology of California native plants for the general public, as well as a volunteer program. Educational programs for children include plant-animal relations, butterflies, and human uses of native plant materials. TPF K-12 education programs

Events
Major events include an Annual Native Plant Garden Tour in the greater Los Angeles area, featuring gardens with at least 50% California native plants, the Wild Flower Hotline providing locations to view Spring wild flowers in California; and changing art gallery exhibits.

Theodore Payne Art Gallery
The Theodore Payne Art Gallery exhibits feature historical and contemporary artworks depicting the California flora as botanical illustrations and botanical portrait interpretations, as well as cultural, historical, and other exhibits featuring the California flora.

Historical artists featured in the gallery include Alice Chittenden, Ethel Wickes, Ida Moody, and Jane Pinheiro. Contemporary artists featured include Gene Bauer, Fred Kuretski, Richard Dickey, and Ken Gilliland, and artists Melanie Symonds, Pamela Burgess, Ed Lum, and Elinor Nissley.

See also
List of California native plants
Flora of California

References

External links
Official Theodore Payne Foundation for Wild Flowers and Native Plants website
Theodore Payne Nursery eStore

Flora of California
Environmental organizations based in California
Horticultural organizations based in the United States
Organizations based in Los Angeles
Plant nurseries
San Fernando Valley
Verdugo Mountains
Sun Valley, Los Angeles
Non-profit organizations based in Los Angeles
Natural history of Los Angeles County, California
Environmental organizations based in Los Angeles